OSS 117 n'est pas mort  is the 1957 film debut of Jean Bruce's fictitious secret agent Hubert Bonnisseur de La Bath, alias OSS 117, and the beginning of a long-lasting series. It was released in the United States by Republic Pictures under the title OSS 117 Is Not Dead in 1959

Synopsis 
OSS 117 is asked for help by a female acquaintance Muriel Rousset. She beseeches him to retrieve secret documents which have been stolen from Sir Anthony Lead, the father of Anita and Marion. He complies with her wish and no obstacle or danger can hinder him from meeting her expectations.

Cast 
 Ivan Desny as Hubert Bonnisseur de La Bath (alias OSS 117)
 Magali Noël as Muriel Rousset
 Yves Vincent as Boris Obarian
 Danik Patisson as Anita Lead	
 Marie Déa as Marion Lead
 André Valmy as Joseph Sliven
 Béatrice Arnac as Nahedad Sin

Background
Jean Bruce started publishing OSS 117 novels in 1949, four years before Ian Fleming's first James Bond novel was released. This first film adaptation of OSS 117 also preceded Bond on the silver screen, although the very first Bond adaptation premiered on U.S. television in 1954.

References

External links
 
 (English)

1950s spy thriller films
1957 films
French spy thriller films
Republic Pictures films
French black-and-white films
1950s French films